SS Sidney Lanier was a Liberty ship built in the United States during World War II. She was named after Sidney Lanier, an American musician, poet and author.

Construction
Sidney Lanier was laid down on 22 October 1942, under a Maritime Commission (MARCOM) contract, MC hull 1197, by the St. Johns River Shipbuilding Company, Jacksonville, Florida; she was sponsored by Mrs. Thomas W. Ryan, Jr., the wife of the corporate director of the St. John's River SB Co., she was launched on 22 May 1943.

History
She was allocated to Seas Shipping Co., Inc., on 7 July 1943. On 6 December 1946, she was placed in the National Defense Reserve Fleet, Astoria, Oregon. On 22 April 1955, she was withdrawn from the fleet to be prepared for loading with grain under the "Grain Program 1955", she returned unloaded on 2 May 1955. She was sold for scrapping, on 14 March 1961, to Schnitzer Brothers, for $56,785.21. She was withdrawn from the fleet, 25 May 1961.

References

Bibliography

 
 
 
 

 

Liberty ships
Ships built in Jacksonville, Florida
1943 ships
Astoria Reserve Fleet
Astoria Reserve Fleet Grain Program